Sophronica fusca is a species of beetle in the family Cerambycidae. It was described by Kolbe in 1893.

References

Sophronica
Beetles described in 1893